Abraham McClellan may refer to:
 Abraham McClellan (Missouri politician), State Treasurer of Missouri and Jackson County Judge
 Abraham McClellan (Tennessee politician), United States Congress representative for Tennessee